Caminha is a municipality in the north-west of Portugal, 21 km north from Viana do Castelo, located in the Viana do Castelo District. The population in 2011 was 16,684, in an area of 136.52 km².

Caminha is subdivided into 14 civil parishes. The parish Vilar de Mouros is well known for the oldest rock festival in Portugal. The seat of the municipality is the town (or vila in Portuguese) of Caminha, with 2,500 inhabitants.

The town is on the coastal part of the Portuguese Way path of the Camino de Santiago.

The present Mayor is Luís Miguel da Silva Mendonça Alves. The municipal holiday is Easter Monday.

General information
Caminha is located 2 km from the Atlantic Ocean, on the southern side of the Minho estuary, where this river is met by the smaller and meandering Coura. Here the Minho reaches its widest point (about 2 km) and marks the border between Portugal and Galiza. The highly scenic area, with the wide estuary marked by low-tide sandbars, a pastoral and green rural landscape, and pine forests on the slopes of the granitic mountains is increasingly popular for second homes and as a summer resort.

History
Despite Strabo's reference to Phoenician docks in the mouth of the Minho, no further evidence was found. An islet at the confluence of the Minho and Coura, now connected to the mainland, was the site of a small military settlement in Roman Gallaecia. Caminha was called Camenae or Camina during the period of Sueve dominationas part of the Kingdom of Galicia in the 5th century. The area was depopulated due to Arab and Norman raids, and slowly reoccupied after the 10th century. Around 1060, during the reign of Ferdinand I of Galicia and León, Caminha was briefly a county and it is known that a castle existed in the area.

In the 13th century, Caminha was just a fishing village until King Afonso III decided to build a modern castle and a fortified village following the bastide model, finished in 1260. At that time, the region was of great military importance, since it was located at the border with Galicia. The castle was later reinforced by Kings Dinis I, when reclaimed land finally connected the original island to the shore, and Ferdinand I. Although most of the walls and towers were torn down or built over, the oval shape of the castle is still clearly visible in the design of some streets, and the keep tower is still intact and serves as entrance to the historical centre. The pinewood of Camarido, stabilizing the sandbars at the mouth of the Minho, was another important initiative of Dinis I.

The first letter of feudal rights (foral) dates from 1284. Caminha belonged to the crown until King Ferdinand I established in 1371 the County of Caminha, whose first count was Álvaro Pires de Castro. In 1390, King John I granted much freedom to the town (creating a póvoa marítima), leading maritime commerce to flourish. In the 15th and 16th centuries, it became one of the main ports in Northern Portugal, trading extensively with Northern Europe, Africa and India. A witness of this golden age is the main church (Igreja Matriz), built between the 15th and 16th centuries in an exuberant late Gothic-Renaissance mixed style. King Manuel I granted Caminha a new foral in 1512. King Manuel also rebuilt the Ínsua Fort (Forte da Ínsua), located in an island at sea and close to the village of Moledo.

After Portugal regained its independence from Spain in 1640, King John IV remodeled the fortifications of Caminha following modern ballistic advances. The Ínsua Fort was also remodeled. Together with the fortifications of Viana do Castelo, Valença, and Monção, the castle of Caminha was part of the defence line against the Castilians in the North.

With time, Caminha was superseded by Viana do Castelo in dominating maritime trade in Northern Portugal. Now Caminha lives from trade and tourism and it is connected to Galiza by a car ferry and to the rest of the country by rail and highways.

Attractions
The large Parish Church (begun 1488) is one of the most significant buildings illustrating the transition from Gothic to Renaissance in Portugal, with Manueline influence. Several architects from Northern Spain participated in its long construction. The outstanding timber roof in the interior has rich decoration showing Moorish influences (Mudéjar style).

Other major points of interest include the main square (Renaissance fountain of 1551), several Gothic and Renaissance houses in the old core and main square, and remains of medieval and 17th-century fortifications. Some pre-Roman archeological findings and ethnographic pieces are shown in the modest Municipal Museum.

The marshes along the Coura are protected and good for birdwatching.

The Atlantic beaches in the area are wide and have good sand but tend to be windy for part of the day; the Moledo beach (4 km south) attracts surfers.  River and sea excursions can be arranged with local fishermen.

South of the Coura, the small granitic range ("Serra") of Arga (823 m) provides ample opportunities for hiking, cyclocross and canyoning. In the wooded northern slopes is the small monastery of S. João de Arga (popular place for picnics, camping and exploring peaks and streams; also venue for a religious festival) and the village of Castanheira (scenic terraced fields and natural pools).

A weekly market is held every Wednesday. Work from local coppersmiths and lacemakers can be found around town.

Parishes
Administratively, the municipality is divided into 14 civil parishes (freguesias):
 Âncora
 Arga (Baixo, Cima e São João)
 Argela
 Caminha (Matriz) e Vilarelho
 Dem
 Gondar e Orbacém
 Lanhelas
 Moledo e Cristelo
 Riba de Âncora
 Seixas
 Venade e Azevedo
 Vila Praia de Âncora
 Vilar de Mouros
 Vile

Population

Notable people 
 João Lourenço Rebelo (1610–1661) a composer who adopted the Venetian polychoral style. 
 Sidónio Pais (1872–1918) a politician, military officer and diplomat. The fourth President of the First Portuguese Republic in 1918. A charismatic, controversial and divisive figure.
 and
 José Vieira (born 1932) & Rui Valença (born 1932) & Ilídio Silva (born 1932) & José Porto (born 1933) & Jorge Cravinho (born 1933) are Portuguese rowers who competed in the Rowing at the 1960 Summer Olympics – Men's coxed four event.

References

External links

Municipality official website

 
Municipalities of Viana do Castelo District